Teresa Shu-Fong Wang is an American biochemist. 

Teresa Shu-Fong Wang (also Teresa S. Wang) (born November 16, 1937) is an American biochemist. She is an emeritus Stanford University professor, and the K. Bensch Endowed Chair Professor in Experimental Pathology of Department of Pathology at the Stanford University School of Medicine.  Her scientific pursuit focuses on the biochemical mechanisms of chromosome replication proteins, and molecular mechanisms of their involvement in maintaining genome integrity during chromosome replication.

1. Early life and Education

Teresa S. Wang was born in China but later moved to Taiwan after 1949.  She earned a bachelor’s of science degree in Biochemistry from  National Taiwan University in 1960,and a Ph.D. in Chemistry from the University of Texas at Austin in 1965 from Joanne Ravel. 

2. Work

Academic Positions

From 1967 to 1968, Wang was a postdoctoral researcher at the Georgetown University School of Medicine. She joined Stanford Universityin 1969 as a Research Associate and Senior Research Associate, and then appointed Associate professor in 1986, and Professor in 1990 of the Department of Pathology Stanford University School of Medicine.  Wang was appointed the Klaus-Bensch Professor of Pathology in 2004  and later retired as Emeritus Professor in 2012.  

Research Achievements

Dr. Wang’s research investigated the biochemical mechanisms of enzymes and proteins involving in chromosome DNA replication; and the cells’ response to chromosome replication stress and DNA damage to maintain genomic stability.   

Her lab was the first to use reverse-genetic approach to isolate the cDNA clones encoding the catalytic polypeptide of the principal chromosome replication initiation enzyme, DNA polymerase alpha, of human cells. Significantly, analysis of the deduced amino-acid sequence of the human DNA polymerase alpha revealed six protein regions that are highly conserved in other family B DNA polymerases including yeast, bacteriophages T4, phage phi 29, herpes family viruses, vaccinia virus and adenovirus. 
Her lab generated a bank of mutant DNA polymerases alpha proteins by site-directed mutagenesis of those highly conserved amino acid residues in the three most conserved protein regions.  They then functionally expressed each mutant proteins, following by steady-state kinetic analyses of the catalytic functions of each mutant proteins. These three most conserved protein regions were confirmed as the functional active site of the DNA polymerase.  Furthermore, many amino acid residues in the three most conserved protein regions were identified being functionally required for deoxynucleotide (dNTP) interaction, catalytic metal ion binding, and primer and template DNA interaction. These residues were later supported by crystallographic analysis of a viral DNA polymerase in the family B DNA polymerases. 

The availability of the functionally active recombinant human DNA polymerase alpha has allowed the findings of how the this polymerase interacts with the initiation proteins of several pathogenic DNA viruses such as SV40, BPV, HPV-11, and herpes simplex virus type 1 to initiate the viral DNA replication in human cells. These findings have provided significant contributions to anti-DNA viral drug designs.  

Dr. Wang’s lab also investigated how cells respond to chromosome replication stress and DNA damage to maintain the cells’ genomic stability. She used a model organism, fission yeast (Schizosaccharomyces pombe), taking a genetic, biochemical, and cell biology approach for the studies.  

Her genetic studies of fission yeast had found that mutations in replication genes often induce mutator phenotypes. To prevent deleterious mutator phenotypes caused by defective replication proteins, cells activate a complex set of signal transduction response checkpoint pathway.  The checkpoint pathways regulate cell-cycle transition, induce tolerance by up-regulating and recruiting special polymerases (translesion polymerases) onto chromatin for mutagenic synthesis to tolerate the stress and to facilitate replication fork re-start, also can regulate an endonuclease to prevent deleterious genomic rearrangement, or in some cases to induce apoptosis.

Awards and honors

The K. Bensch Endowed Chair Professorship in Experimental Pathology in 2004 

Fellow of American Association for the Advancement of Science (AAAS) in 2006 

Distinguish Scientist Lecture Recipient of National Institute of Environmental Health Science of National Institutes of Health (NIH) in 2009 

Asian American Faculty Award of Stanford University in 2010. 

Dr. Wang was a member of several professional organizations, including the American Society for Biochemistry and Molecular Biology, the American Society for Microbiology, the American Society for Cell Biology, and the American Association for Cancer Research Inc.  She had served as the principal investigator of three National Institute of Health/ National Cancer Institute supported programs.  She was the Director of Tumor Biology postdoctoral training program for MD/PhD fellows of Stanford School of Medicine.  

Dr. Wang had served as an editorial board member of several scientific journals and was study section committee member of two National Institute of Health scientific grant reviewing boards from 1997 to 1999. Between 2005-2008, she served on the Board of Scientific Counselors for the National Cancer Institute.  In 2006, Wang was elected a fellow of the American Association for the Advancement of Science.  She had published more than 100 articles on her research in Nature, Genes & Development, Molecular Cell Biology, Genetics, Molecular Biology of Cell, Journal of Biological Chemistry, Biochemistry, Proceeding National Academic Science. Annual Reviews of Biochemistry, and Encyclopedia of Molecular Medicine.

She had authored four U.S. patents: 

(1) 6,008,045, issued 12/28/99  (serial number 07/792,600) with Patent Title: AcHDP or Compositions and Methods for Template-Dependent Enzymatic Synthesis of Nucleic Acid (r-human DNA polymerase alpha expressed in baculovirus). 

(2) U.S. patent: 6,103,473, issued 8/15/00 (divisional of 07/792,600). Patent Title:  Drug Screening

(3) U.S. patent: 6,100,023, issued 8/8/00  (divisional of 07/,792,00). Patent Title:  Drug Design Assay

(4) U.S. patent: 6,670,161, issued 12/30/03 (divisional of 09/157,021, now pat. no. 6,100,023). Patent Title:  Compositions and Methods for Template-dependent Enzymatic Synthesis of Nucleic Acid.

References

Living people
Year of birth missing (living people)
Taiwanese pathologists
Taiwanese emigrants to the United States
National Taiwan University alumni
University of Texas at Austin alumni
Stanford University faculty
Fellows of the American Association for the Advancement of Science
20th-century Taiwanese scientists
21st-century Taiwanese scientists
Taiwanese chemists